Franz Engel (1834 in Röbel – 1920 in Neubrandenburg) was a German explorer and naturalist.

He traveled extensively in South America in the years 1857–63 and published the results of his explorations in several volumes, including Studien unter den Tropen Amerikas (“Studies among the American tropics,” 2d ed., 1879), ‘Aus dem Pflanzerstaate Zulia’ (“From the plantation state of Zulia,” 1881). From 1872 to 1896 he published the Landwirthschaftliche Jahrbücher (“Agricultural yearbooks”).

Notes

References

External links
 

1834 births
1920 deaths
19th-century German botanists
German explorers
Explorers of South America